Najm or Najam (also Negm,  in Egyptian dialect / pronunciation) is an Arabic word meaning MORNING STAR.  It is used as a given name in Middle East, Central Asia and South Asia. Najm is the male version of the name and Najma is the female version of the name. Najm/Negm is also a common Arab family name.

People

Najm
Najm Afandi (1893–1975), Indian Urdu poet
Najm Hamad Al Ahmad (born 1969), Syrian jurist and politician
Najm Allal (born 1966), Western Saharan singer, guitarist and writer of lyrics in Spanish
Najm Hosain Syed (born 1936), Pakistani writer in Punjabi

Nagem
Nagem Hatab, Iraqi who died in US custody

Najam
Najam Sethi (born 1948), Pakistani journalist, editor, and media personality
Najam Sheraz (born 1969), Pakistani pop singer, song writer, and peace activist

Najem
Najem Wali (born 1956), Iraqi-German author

Najim

Nadjim
Nadjim Abdou (born 1984), aka as Jimmy Abdou, Comoros-French footballer, playing in England

Najmul
Najmul Hasan (born 1984), Bangladeshi qari (Qur'an reciter)
Najmul Millat (1863-1938), Indian faqīh (Islamic jurist)

Surname

Najm
Abolqasem Najm (1892–1981), Iranian politician, cabinet minister, and diplomat

Najem
Mohamed Ag Najem, Tuareg rebel leader against government of Mali

Najam
Adil Najam, Pakistani-American academic

Negm
Ahmed Fouad Negm (1929–2013), Egyptian vernacular poet
Nawara Negm (born 1973), Egyptian journalist, blogger and human rights activist

Places
Najmabad (disambiguation), several places
Najm, Iran, village in Iran
Shurab-e Najm-e Soheyli, village in Iran
Najim Jihad, housing compound outside Jalalabad, Afghanistan, where Osama bin Laden lived
Qal'at Najm, castle in Syria

Sports
Nedjm Chabab Magra, or NC Magra, Algerian football club
Najm de Marrakech, Moroccan football club

Other
An-Najm, (The Star), the 53rd sura of the Qur'an
Najm is an arabized variant of the Atari 65XE computer sold in the Arab world

See also
 Najim
 Njeim
 Najima (disambiguation)
 Najma (disambiguation)

References

Given names
Arabic masculine given names
Surnames